Abirabad (also Romanized as ‘Abīrābād) is a village in Howmeh Rural District, in the Central District of Damghan County, Semnan Province, Iran. At the 2006 census, its population was 22, in 11 families.

References 

Populated places in Damghan County